Zapardiel may refer to:

Bercial de Zapardiel, municipality located in the province of Ávila, Castile and León, Spain
Bernuy-Zapardiel, municipality located in the province of Ávila, Castile and León, Spain
Castellanos de Zapardiel, municipality located in the province of Ávila, Castile and León, Spain
Salvador de Zapardiel, municipality located in the province of Valladolid, Castile and León, Spain
San Esteban de Zapardiel, municipality located in the province of Ávila, Castile and León, Spain
Zapardiel de la Cañada, municipality located in the province of Ávila, Castile and León, Spain
Zapardiel de la Ribera, municipality located in the province of Ávila, Castile and León, Spain